Oopsis is a genus of beetles in the family Cerambycidae, containing the following species:

 Oopsis albopicta Aurivillius, 1928
 Oopsis bougainvillei Breuning, 1976
 Oopsis brenneocaudata Fairmaire, 1879
 Oopsis excavata Breuning, 1939
 Oopsis foudrasi (Montrouzier, 1861)
 Oopsis griseocaudata Fairmaire, 1881
 Oopsis keiensis Breuning, 1970
 Oopsis lycia Dillon & Dillon, 1952
 Oopsis marshallensis Gressitt, 1956
 Oopsis nutator (Fabricius, 1787)
 Oopsis oblongipennis Fairmaire, 1850
 Oopsis postmaculata Breuning, 1939
 Oopsis ropicoides Breuning, 1939
 Oopsis striatella Fairmaire, 1879
 Oopsis uvua Dillon & Dillon, 1952
 Oopsis variivestris Fairmaire, 1879
 Oopsis velata Dillon & Dillon, 1952
 Oopsis zitja Dillon & Dillon, 1952

References

 
Cerambycidae genera